Bradley Ray Wilcox (born December 25, 1959) is a professor of ancient scripture at Brigham Young University (BYU) and has been the second counselor in the Young Men general presidency of the Church of Jesus Christ of Latter-day Saints (LDS Church) since April 2020.

He is the author of several books, most notably The Continuous Atonement. He often speaks at various events of the LDS Church and served on its Sunday School General Board.

Early life and career
Wilcox was raised in Provo, Utah and, for a time, lived in Ethiopia. He served as a missionary for the LDS Church in the Chile Viña del Mar Mission, where he wrote the mission song. He attended BYU, graduating with a bachelor's degree in elementary education in 1985. Wilcox then worked as a sixth-grade teacher in Provo. He later earned a master's degree in teaching and learning, also from BYU. Wilcox received a Doctor of Philosophy from the University of Wyoming in "curriculum and instruction with a focus in literacy." He then became a professor at BYU, first in the Teacher Education Department, and later in the Department of Ancient Scripture.

LDS Church service
He has served in multiple capacities within the LDS Church, including scout leader, bishop, member of the Sunday School General Board, and as president of the Chile Santiago East Mission from 2003 to 2006. In 2007, he was called as a counselor in the presidency of the BYU 4th Stake. Wilcox has often been a speaker at such Church Educational System programs as Especially for Youth, BYU Education Week, and the BYU Women's Conference. His speech given at BYU, His Grace is Sufficient, is "the most viewed speech of all time among BYU speeches, and has more than 400,000 views on YouTube," according to Deseret News. On April 4, 2020, Wilcox was called as second counselor to Steven J. Lund in the LDS Church's Young Men general presidency.

Controversial speech
On February 6, 2022, Wilcox delivered a devotional speech for the youth in Alpine, Utah (which was recorded on Zoom and widely shared on social media) and subsequently broadly criticized for its racial implications in his efforts to describe a point on faith in God's timing. He issued an apology the next day. After subsequent discussions with several African-American friends, including Ahmad S. Corbitt, First Counselor in the Young Men General Presidency, Wilcox issued a second apology during a youth devotional the following Sunday. Reporter Jana Riess stated that Wilcox's speech and scornful tone revealed that he "felt disdainful toward women" and believed that "God is a racist", and that his subsequent "not-quite-apologies" did not go far enough. Videos have surfaced of at least two other instances of Wilcox making similar speeches downplaying the concerns of latter-day saints over the priesthood and temple ban against Black members of the church.

Personal life
Wilcox married Deborah G. Gunnell and they are the parents of four children. She is a registered nurse and served a mission in Guatemala.

Works 
Books written by Wilcox include The Continuous Atonement, The Best Kept Secrets of Parenting, and Raising Ourselves to the Bar. He has also written articles on how to encourage children to read.

Articles 
"May I Have This Dance?", New Era, August 1979 
"Are You There?", New Era, April 1990
"Helping Youth Feel They Belong," Ensign, April 1998
"Why Write It?" Ensign, September 1999
"If We Can Laugh at It, We Can Live with It," Ensign, March 2000
 "Effect of Difficulty Levels on Second-Grade Delayed Readers Using Dyad Reading," The Journal of Educational Research, with Alisa Morgan and J. Lloyd Eldredge, 2000
 "Watching Over the Web," BYU Magazine, Fall 2002
"Keep Texting from Taking Over," Liahona, with Russell Wilcox, August 2007
 "Grace - Common Ground or Battleground?" LDS Living, 11 January 2020

Books 
 Growing Up: Gospel Answers about Maturation and Sex (2000)
Where Do Babies Come From? (2004)
Raising Ourselves to the Bar (2007)
The Continuous Atonement (Deseret Book Company, February 4, 2009)
Developing Literacy: Reading and Writing To, With, and by Children, with Timothy G. Morrison (2013)
52 Life-changing Questions from the Book of Mormon (2013)
Armor Up! with John Bytheway, Laurel Christensen, John Hilton III, Hank Smith, and Anthony Sweat (2013)
Suit Up! with John Bytheway, Laurel Christensen, John Hilton III, Hank Smith, and Anthony Sweat (2013)
The Continuous Conversion: God Isn't Just Proving Us, He's Improving Us (2013)
With Healing in His Wings with Gary J. Coleman, John M. Madsen, Gaye Strathearn, Andrew C. Skinner, and Brent L. Top (2013)
The 7-Day Christian: How Living Your Beliefs Every Day Can Change the World (Ensign Peak, April 8, 2014)
Tips For Tackling Teenage Troubles (Shadow Mountain, June 19, 2014  )
The Best-Kept Secrets of Parenting: 18 Principles That Can Change Everything with Jerrick Robbins (Deseret Book Company, July 15, 2014)
How to Hug a Hedgehog: 12 Keys for Connecting with Teens with Jerrick Robbins (Deseret Book Company, October 7, 2014)
Filled with Mercy: Daily Reflections On the Atonement (2014)
The Continuous Atonement for Teens (2015)
Practicing for Heaven: The Parable of the Piano Lessons (2015)
A Year of Powerful Prayer (2016)
Changed Through His Grace (Deseret Book Company, February 27, 2017)
Because of the Messiah in a Manger (2018)
Come Unto Me: Illuminating the Savior's Life, Mission, Parables, and Miracles (2018)
Born to Change the World: Your Part in Gathering Israel (Deseret Book Company, May 13, 2019)
Because of the Christ on Calvary (Deseret Book Company, March 2, 2020)

Children's Books 
Hip, Hip, Hooray! for Annie McRae with Julie Olson (Deseret Book Company, March 12, 2019)

References

External links
BYU Religious Education Official profile
Brad Wilcox LDS Church Leader Biography
Brad Wilcox papers, L. Tom Perry Special Collections, Harold B. Lee Library, Brigham Young University

1959 births
Living people
20th-century Mormon missionaries
21st-century Mormon missionaries
American children's writers
American expatriates in Ethiopia
American leaders of the Church of Jesus Christ of Latter-day Saints
American Mormon missionaries in Chile
Brigham Young University alumni
Brigham Young University faculty
Counselors in the General Presidency of the Young Men (organization)
Harold B. Lee Library-related 21st century articles
Latter Day Saints from Utah
Latter Day Saints from Wyoming
Mission presidents (LDS Church)
Sunday School (LDS Church) people
University of Wyoming alumni
Writers from Provo, Utah